Jeff Zatkoff (born June 9, 1987) is an American professional ice hockey goaltender who is currently an unrestricted free agent who most recently played for the Straubing Tigers of the Deutsche Eishockey Liga (DEL).

Playing career
As a youth, Zatkoff played in the 2001 Quebec International Pee-Wee Hockey Tournament with the Detroit Little Caesars minor ice hockey team.

College
Zatkoff was drafted in the third round of the 2006 NHL Entry Draft, 74th overall, by the Los Angeles Kings after playing collegiately for the Miami University Redhawks. Zatkoff was named CCHA All-Conference Team honorable mention in 2006–07 as a sophomore. He was also named Rookie of the Year in 2005–06 as a freshman for the Redhawks, starting 20 games and helping lead the team to a regular-season CCHA Conference title.

Professional

Los Angeles Kings
On April 10, 2008, Zatkoff signed a three-year entry-level contract with the Los Angeles Kings. Zatkoff was also signed to an amateur try-out agreement with the Ontario Reign on April 11, 2008. He made his professional debut with the Reign, appearing in 37 games during the 2008–09 season. Zatkoff played for the Manchester Monarchs through the 2011–12 season.

Pittsburgh Penguins
Zatkoff signed a two-year contract with the Pittsburgh Penguins on July 1, 2012. On March 28, 2013, Zatkoff was recalled by Pittsburgh to be a backup for Tomas Vokoun for a game against the Winnipeg Jets due to a neck injury suffered by Marc-André Fleury. Vokoun played the entire game and Zatkoff was returned to Wilkes-Barre the following day when doctors cleared Fleury to return. Zatkoff and teammate Brad Thiessen were awarded with the Harry "Hap" Holmes Memorial Award at the conclusion of the 2012–13 AHL season. The Hap Holmes Award is given to the goaltender(s) who play at least 25 games for the team that allows the fewest goals against over the course of the season.

Zatkoff was expected to spend the 2013–14 season with the Wilkes-Barre/Scranton Penguins. However, a blood clot suffered by Vokoun meant that Zatkoff started the season backing up Pittsburgh starter Marc-André Fleury. On October 11, 2013, Zatkoff made his NHL debut, making 24 saves in a 6–3 loss to the Florida Panthers. His first NHL victory was a 3–0 shutout of the Blue Jackets in Columbus on November 2, 2013.

On April 13, 2016, Zatkoff started Game 1 of the Penguins' first round series against the New York Rangers. Regular starter Marc-André Fleury was out with a concussion and backup Matt Murray was also in concussion protocol. Zatkoff made 35 saves on 37 shots and was named the game's second star, helping the Penguins to a 5–2 win. After a loss in Game 2, Zatkoff was replaced by Murray, who remained in net for the rest of the playoffs despite Fleury's eventual return to the lineup. The Penguins eventually won the Stanley Cup on June 12, 2016 against the San Jose Sharks; the victory earned him a Stanley Cup ring, his name on the Cup and the nickname "Mr. Game One" among teammates and fans.

Return to Los Angeles
On July 1, 2016, Zatkoff ended his tenure with the Penguins, returning to the Kings on a one-year, two-way free agent contract. Installed as the Kings backup for the 2016–17 season, Zatkoff struggled to find form and despite the loss of starting goaltender Jonathan Quick to long-term injury, he was surpassed on the depth chart and assigned to AHL affiliate, the Ontario Reign after 13 games.

Columbus Blue Jackets
Not having played a game past the midpoint of the 2017–18 season, on January 22, 2018, Zatkoff was traded by the Kings to the Columbus Blue Jackets in exchange for future considerations. He was immediately assigned to the team's AHL affiliate, the Cleveland Monsters.

Europe
As a free agent from the Blue Jackets in the following off-season, and with little NHL interest, Zatkoff opted to pursue a European career in signing a one-year contract with German club, the Straubing Tigers of the DEL, on July 6, 2018.

International play

Zatkoff represented the United States at the 2007 World Junior Ice Hockey Championships, held in Sweden, where his team earned a bronze medal.

Personal life
Jeff is the great nephew of Roger Zatkoff, who played in the National Football League for the Detroit Lions and Green Bay Packers. His father, Jeff, was drafted by the Indiana Pacers of the National Basketball Association after playing collegiately at Eastern Michigan, and attended high school at Chippewa Valley High School.

Career statistics

Regular season and playoffs

Awards and honors

References

External links
 

1987 births
American men's ice hockey goaltenders
Cleveland Monsters players
Ice hockey people from Detroit
Living people
Los Angeles Kings draft picks
Los Angeles Kings players
Manchester Monarchs (AHL) players
Miami RedHawks men's ice hockey players
Ontario Reign (AHL) players
Ontario Reign (ECHL) players
Pittsburgh Penguins players
Sioux City Musketeers players
Stanley Cup champions
Straubing Tigers players
Wilkes-Barre/Scranton Penguins players